The Ariaria International Market is an open-air market located in Aba, a city in Abia State Southeast Nigeria. The market  is one of the largest markets in West Africa and  nicknamed "China of Africa" because of its versatility in the making of wears and leather works.

Historical and structural background
Ariaria International Market was established in 1976 following a fire outbreak that destroyed the old Ekeoha Market in Aba. The market was originally sited in a swampy area.
The market is known for its shoemaking and leather works thus making it one of the largest leather shoe-making markets in West Africa with an estimated two million traders.  For more than two decades, the market has serviced clients home and abroad. Manufacturers in the market boast that their clientele base extends beyond the shores of Africa. “Many citizens in Europe and Africa have the market to thank for many of the leather shoes they wear,” Amobi Nwanagu, President, StandUp Africa, claims. The market cuts across three local government areas, the Aba North, Aba South , and Osisioma.

References

Populated places in Abia State
Buildings and structures completed in 1976
Retail markets in Nigeria
20th-century architecture in Nigeria